Nexus International University (NIU), formerly Virtual University of Uganda (VUU) is a private university in Uganda. The institution is accredited and supervised by the Uganda National Council for Higher Education (UNCHE).

Location
The geographical coordinates of the university campus are:00°18'03.0"N, 32°36'23.0"E (Latitude:0.300833; Longitude:32.606389).

History
The university was established in 2011. It is the first higher education institution in Uganda to teach its syllabus entirely online. The university adopted the name Virtual University of Uganda (VUU), from 2011 until 2019. VUU admitted its first cohort of students in January 2012.

Academic courses
NIU offers the following academic courses, as of January 2015.

 Bachelor of Business Administration and Management
 Postgraduate Diploma in Public Health
 Postgraduate Diploma in International Development
 Postgraduate Diploma Business Administration
 Postgraduate Diploma ICTs for Development 
 Master of Public Health
 Master of Arts in International Development
 Master of Science in Information and Communications Technology for Development
 Master of Business Administration
 Executive Master of Business Administration

In 2020, new courses introduced, after the University had re-branded, include: 1. An MBA in Oil and Gas 2. MBA in Environmental Management 3. MBA in International Development 4. MBA in Tourism and Hospitality Management and 5. MBA Women in Finance.

Postgraduate Diploma courses last 24 months. Master's degree courses last thirty months. In addition, the university offers in excess of 70 short courses, lasting a few weeks to a few months. The short courses are listed at the university website, referenced here.

See also
 Education in Uganda
 List of universities in Uganda
 List of university leaders in Uganda

References

External links
 Traditional universities are on the way out: online is the future for Africa As of 8 March 2018.

Universities and colleges in Uganda
Private universities and colleges
Educational institutions established in 2012
2012 establishments in Uganda
Education in Kampala